KTSY (89.5 FM) is a radio station broadcasting a Contemporary Christian format. Licensed to Caldwell, Idaho, United States, the station serves the Boise area. The station is currently owned by the Idaho Conference of the Seventh-day Adventist Church.

Repeaters
KTSY is also carried on full-power stations in Baker City (KESY on 91.9 MHz) and McCall (KGSY on 88.3 MHz).

References

External links

TSY
Caldwell, Idaho